Dryolestes is an extinct genus of Late Jurassic mammal from the Morrison Formation and the Alcobaça Formation of Portugal. The type species Dryolestes priscus is present in stratigraphic zones 2, 5, and 6.

See also 
 Prehistoric mammal
 List of prehistoric mammals
 Paleobiota of the Morrison Formation

References

Further reading 
 Foster, J. (2007). Jurassic West: The Dinosaurs of the Morrison Formation and Their World. Indiana University Press. 389pp.

Dryolestida
Kimmeridgian genus first appearances
Tithonian genus extinctions
Jurassic mammals of Europe
Jurassic Portugal
Fossils of Portugal
Morrison mammals
Fossil taxa described in 1878
Taxa named by Othniel Charles Marsh
Prehistoric mammal genera